Sånga-Sundby is a village (smaller locality) in Ekerö Municipality, Stockholm County, southeastern Sweden.

References

Populated places in Ekerö Municipality
Uppland